"Black Tears" is a song by Australian alternative rock band Powderfinger.

Black Tears may also refer to:

 Black Tears (short story)
 Black Tears (1927 film)
 Black Tears (1998 film)
 "Black Tears", song by Imelda May from Life Love Flesh Blood
 "Black Tears", song by Edge of Sanity from Purgatory Afterglow
 "Black Tears", song by Jason Aldean from Night Train